The Church-in-the-Gardens, also known as Community Congregational Christian Church, is a historic Congregational church complex located in Forest Hills, Queens, New York. The complex includes the church (1915), Community House (1926), and Parish Hall (1953) connected by breezeways and a separate parsonage (1929).  The buildings are all in an eclectic Tudor Revival style.  The church was designed by architect Grosvenor Atterbury and is a rectangular building with a prominent tower and attached bell tower.  The congregation joined the United Church of Christ in May 2012.

It was listed on the National Register of Historic Places in 2009.

References

External links

United Church of Christ churches in New York City
Bell towers in the United States
Properties of religious function on the National Register of Historic Places in Queens, New York
Tudor Revival architecture in New York City
Churches completed in 1915
Churches in Queens, New York
1915 establishments in New York (state)
Forest Hills, Queens